Ferschnitz is a town in the district of Amstetten in Lower Austria in Austria.

Population

References

Cities and towns in Amstetten District